Alan Davis (born 1956) is a British writer and artist of comic books.

Alan Davis may also refer to:

Alan L. Davis, American computer scientist (PhD 1972, Utah)
Alan M. Davis (born 1949), American computer scientist (PhD 1975, Illinois)
Allan Davis (footballer) (born 1948), Australian rules footballer
Alan Davis (priest) (1938–2021), Archdeacon of West Cumberland
Alan G. Davis, American jurist in Delaware

See also
Al Davis (disambiguation)
Alan Davies (disambiguation)
Alun Davies (disambiguation)
Allen Davis (disambiguation)